Shinzō Watanabe (渡辺 信三 Watanabe Shinzō, 23 December 1935) is a Japanese mathematician, who has made fundamental contributions to probability theory, stochastic processes and stochastic differential equations. He is regarded and revered as one of the fundamental contributors to the modern probability theory and Stochastic calculus. The pioneering book “Stochastic Differential Equations and Diffusion Processes” he wrote with Nobuyuki Ikeda has attracted a lot of researchers into the area and is known as the “Ikeda-Watanabe” for researchers in the field of stochastic analysis. He had been served as the editor of Springer Mathematics.

Biography

Watanabe received  his bachelor's degree  from Kyoto University in 1958 and  completed his Ph.D. under Kiyosi Itô in 1963. Watanabe subsequently became a professor at Kyoto University. He was also a visiting professor at Stanford University and participated in the organizing committees of international Japanese/Soviet seminars on probability theory. He has one daughter Shiori Watanabe.

Scientific contributions

Watanabe has made many important contributions to stochastic analysis and the theory of stochastic processes.
In an important work with H. Kunita, he extended K. Ito's theory of stochastic integration, initially developed by Ito for Markov processes, to square integrable martingales.
 This theory, known as the Kunita-Watanabe extension is based on the crucial Kunita–Watanabe inequality for the stochastic integral.

Another important contribution of Watanabe has been to use the Malliavin calculus to establish a theory of generalized functionals on Wiener space, by analogy to Laurent Schwartz's theory of distributions, and apply this theory to obtain expansions of heat kernels.

Watanabe also made important contributions to the study of multidimensional diffusion processes with boundary conditions 
and continuous-time branching processes.

Awards and honours

In 1989 he received the Autumn Prize of the Mathematical Society of Japan.

In 1983 he was an invited speaker at the International Congress of Mathematicians in Warsaw (Excursion point processes and diffusion).
In 1996 he received the Japan Academy Prize in Mathematics.

Selected publications
 Noboyuki Ikeda, Shinzo Watanabe:  
 with Toshio Yamada: 
 
 
 Limit theorem for a class of branching processes, in: Markov processes potential theory, Proc. Symp. Univ. Wisconsin, Madison, 1967, 205-232

References

External links
 On discontinuous additive functionals and Levy measures of a Markov process / By Shinto WATANABE (Received July 15, 1964)
 The Japanese Contributions to Martingales Shinzo WATANABE / Journ@l électronique d’Histoire des Probabilités et de la Statistique/ Electronic Journal for History of Probability and Statistics . Vol.5, n°1. Juin/June 2009

1935 births
Living people
20th-century Japanese mathematicians
21st-century Japanese mathematicians
Probability theorists
Kyoto University alumni
Academic staff of Kyoto University